Victor Albert Bubas (January 28, 1927 – April 16, 2018) was an American college basketball coach for Duke University and the first commissioner of the Sun Belt Conference.

Early life
Bubas graduated from Gary Lew Wallace High School in 1944.  After finishing high school he enrolled at the University of Illinois, playing the 1944–45 season for the Fighting Illini. He then went on to North Carolina State University where he played for Everett Case.  Bubas was an All-Southern Conference selection twice.  After he graduated in 1951 he stayed on as a freshman coach until 1955 and as a varsity assistant coach until he was hired by Duke University in 1959.

At Duke University
During the 1960s Bubas expanded Duke University's basketball program. He took it from a successful regional program that won a lot of games to a national program.

Recruiting
Bubas is widely credited with pioneering the art of recruiting by targeting players very early and gathering information on them before other coaches had learned of them and would send newspaper clippings of Duke games to prospects. As North Carolina legendary coach Dean Smith once stated,
"Vic taught us all how to recruit, we had been starting on prospects in the fall of their senior years while Vic was working on them their junior year. For a while, all of us were trying to catch up with him."

Bubas's tireless efforts paid off as he brought in future All-Americans from all over the country. His first big coup was getting eventual National Player Of The Year Art Heyman to go to Duke. Heyman was originally set to attend North Carolina but a near fight between Heyman's stepfather and UNC head coach Frank McGuire (McGuire took it personally when Heyman's stepfather referred to his program as "a factory") sent Heyman on a different path and Bubas stepped in and was able to convince Heyman to attend Duke.

Another big coup was getting Lexington, Kentucky native and eventual two-time All-American Jeff Mullins from the University of Kentucky and legendary Adolph Rupp. Paired together, Heyman and Mullins formed a devastating duo, reaching the Final Four in 1963 and 1964.

In 1965 Bubas recruited Claudius Claiborne, the first black athlete to play a varsity sport at Duke University.

Performance
At the time, freshmen were not allowed to play on the varsity and only the winner of the ACC Tournament could go to the NCAA Tournament. Vic Bubas' Duke teams still flourished. What began during that 1959–60 season grew rapidly over the course of the decade. In that first season, Duke was blown out twice each by Wake Forest and North Carolina. But in the ACC Tournament, Bubas got revenge, stunning 16th-ranked North Carolina and 18th-ranked Wake Forest in the title game for Duke's first ACC championship. Duke received the automatic bid in the NCAA tournament, where the Blue Devils won two games before losing to 12th-ranked NYU. It was a very surprising first season for the young coach. As his program progressed, Duke would finish in the AP Top-10 basketball poll in seven of his ten seasons. He led Duke to the NCAA Final Four three times (1963, 64 and 66). His teams finished first in league play on four occasions and won four ACC championships, competing in the ACC Tournament championship game in eight of his ten seasons. Bubas led Duke to a 213–67 record, which was the 3rd-highest win total in America during the Sixties. His .761 winning percentage ranks tenth all-time among NCAA coaches.

Retirement and death
Bubas retired from coaching in 1969 and then served as a Duke administrator, eventually becoming the vice president of the university. In 1976, he became the first commissioner of the Sun Belt Conference, a position he held for fourteen years until his retirement. The Sun Belt's all-sports championship trophy, the Vic Bubas Cup, is named after him.

In 2007 Bubas was inducted into the National Collegiate Basketball Hall of Fame.

Bubas died on the morning of April 16, 2018 at age 91.

Head coaching record

See also
 List of NCAA Division I Men's Final Four appearances by coach

References

1927 births
2018 deaths
Basketball coaches from Indiana
Basketball players from Gary, Indiana
Duke Blue Devils men's basketball coaches
Illinois Fighting Illini men's basketball players
National Collegiate Basketball Hall of Fame inductees
NC State Wolfpack men's basketball coaches
NC State Wolfpack men's basketball players
Sportspeople from Gary, Indiana
Sun Belt Conference commissioners
American men's basketball players
Guards (basketball)